Playa de Rodas or Praia das Rodas (Galician) is a slightly curved beach of about 700 m length on the Spanish Cíes Islands, now a national park, lying west of the city of Vigo in the Atlantic Ocean.
The British newspaper The Guardian chose the beach to be the best of the world in 2007.

References 

Beaches of Galicia (Spain)